Heliophila variabilis is a species of flowering plant in the genus Heliophila.

Distribution 
Heliophila variabilis is not endemic to South Africa, but is found from the Richtersveld through Namaqualand to the Pakhuis Mountains and Laingsburg.

Conservation status 
Heliophila variabilis is classified as Least Concern.

References

External links 
 

Brassicaceae
Flora of South Africa
Flora of Southern Africa
Flora of the Cape Provinces